The Solva limekilns are a row of disused limekilns in the harbour of the village of Solva, Pembrokeshire, Wales. The kilns have a Grade II heritage listing.

Description
The row of four linked limekilns is located on the south side of the harbour above the high water line at the base of the Gribyn headland. The kilns are built from rubble stone and include the foundation outline of a watchman's hut. 

There are straight sections of wall linking the row of kilns.

History
There were originally twelve limekilns in Solva and the burning of limestone was one of the main industries of the village. An 1811 report about the village describes "the hot vapour, and the dirt and noise of carting incident to them, make them very offensive proving a great drawback on a residence". Initially on the harbour edge there were only three kilns, according to a watercolour painting dating from 1795. The village's limekilns were used until about 1900.

The row of kilns were restored in 1981-2.

References

Grade II listed buildings in Pembrokeshire
Lime kilns in Wales